MTV Unplugged is the second live album from Spanish singer-songwriter Alejandro Sanz, which turns him into the first Spanish artist in recording an unplugged for MTV, and in this opportunity he resorts to Humberto Gatica's talent as producer and arranger. This album contains an inedit song, "Y Sólo Se Me Ocurre Amarte" dedicated to his daughter Manuela, the song "Aprendiz" that Alejandro composed for the Spanish singer Malú, a different version of "Cómo Te Echo de Menos" and a flamenco song, "Todo Es de Color" by Manuel Molina.

Track listing 
"Cuando Nadie Me Ve" – 5:06
"Y Sólo Se Me Ocurre Amarte" – 4:35
"Amiga Mía" – 5:03
"Se Le Apagó La Luz" – 5:13
"Quisiera Ser" – 4:41
"Aprendiz" – 5:02
"Quiero Morir En Tu Veneno" – 4:30
"Cómo Te Echo De Menos" – 4:29
"Corazón Partío" – 5:00
"Siempre Es De Noche" – 4:50
"Toca Para Mí" – 4:13
"Lo Que Fui Es Lo Que Soy" – 5:24
"Todo Es De Color" – 4:26

Chart performance

Album

Singles

Personnel 

 Cheche Alara – Director
 Tim Barnes – Viola
 Luis Bonilla – Trombone
 Chris Brooke – Assistant engineer
 Huifang Chen – Violin
 Vinnie Colaiuta – Drums
 Helen De Quiroga – Background vocals
 Txell Sust – Background vocals
 Justin Douglas – Assistant
 Brandon Fields – Flute, saxophone
 Scott Flavin – Violin
 Orlando J. Forte – Violin
 Humberto Gatica – Arranger, engineer, mixing, producer
 Chris Glansdorp – Cello
 Kevin Guarnieri – Assistant engineer
 Chad Hailey – Assistant engineer
 Ross Harbaugh – Cello
 David Heuer – Assistant engineer
 Harry Kim – Arranger, trumpet
 Audrey Morrissey – Producer
 Kenny O'Brien – Arranger, background vocals, digital editing, co-producer

 Scott O'Donnell – Viola
 Alfredo Oliva – Strings contractor, violin
 Rafael Padilla – Percussion
 Bill Ross – Arranger
 Kamil Rustam – Guitar
 Armand Sabal-Lecco – Bass
 Javier Salas – Photography
 Alejandro Sanz – Vocals, cajón, Spanish guitar
 Rafael Sañudo – Design
 Eric Schilling – Engineer
 Charlie Singer – Executive producer
 Ramon Stagnaro – Guitar
 Heitor Teixeira Pereira – Guitar
 Ludovico Vagnone – Supervisor
 Rick Valero – Guitar technician
 Javier Valverde – Assistant engineer
 Randy Waldman – Piano
 Pete Wallace – Hammond organ

Awards

Sales and certifications

References 

Alejandro Sanz live albums
Mtv Unplugged (Sanz, Alejandro album)
Albums produced by Humberto Gatica
Latin Grammy Award winners for Album of the Year
2001 live albums
Warner Music Latina live albums
Spanish-language live albums